Living Mirage is the fourth studio album by American band The Head and the Heart, and second album released through Warner Bros. Records. It was announced on March 14, 2019, and officially released on May 17, 2019.  "Missed Connection" was released as the first single on the same day of the album announcement.

On June 26, 2020, the band released a digital deluxe version of the album titled Living Mirage: The Complete Recordings featuring four new songs.

Development
Living Mirage is The Head and the Heart's first studio album since 2016’s Signs of Light. The album was initially considered by the band during a retreat to Joshua Tree National Park. The writing and recording process continued across the country, with sessions in Wisconsin, Seattle, Nashville and Los Angeles. Living Mirage is also the first album that does not feature co-founder Josiah Johnson.

Release and promotion
Living Mirage peaked at number sixteen on the US Billboard 200. On May 22, 2019, the band announced the North American Living Mirage Tour consisting of thirty-nine dates. The tour kicked-off in Buffalo, New York on June 21, 2019.

Singles
On March 14, 2019, "Missed Connection" was released as the album's lead single and was made available for purchase and streaming. The music video was released on April 9, 2019. The second single, "Honeybee" was released on April 5, 2019.

On May 16, 2019, they performed "Missed Connection" on The Tonight Show Starring Jimmy Fallon.

Track listing

Charts

References

2019 albums
The Head and the Heart albums